Nebria haida is a species of beetle from family Carabidae that is endemic to Graham Island, Canada.

References

haida
Beetles described in 1984
Beetles of North America
Endemic fauna of Canada